Navy captain Jeong Bal (정발, 鄭撥, 1553–1592) was a Joseon dynasty navy captain who commanded a garrison at Busan port.

Death 
He was killed in action in 1592, during the Siege of Busan, while defending the garrison from elements of the Japanese vanguard, led by the Christian warlord Konishi Yukinaga.

Eventually, his entire battalion was overrun and massacred by Japanese forces. He was the first high-ranking officer to be killed in combat during the Japanese invasions of Korea (1592–1598).

Some Korean accounts of the war say that Jeong fled the battle rather than fight, but the accepted version is that he stayed and died fighting the invaders. Nanjungjaprok contains the witness reports of survivors of the Siege of Busan, in which the survivors claimed that Jeong stood his ground instead of running. There is a statue of him defending the city in the centre of Busan.

He was enshrined in the Chungnyeolsa (Busan) in 1624.

References

1553 births
1592 deaths
Korean generals
People of the Japanese invasions of Korea (1592–1598)